Unter Verdacht is a German crime television series starring Senta Berger as crime council Dr. Eva-Maria Prohacek. Between 2002 and 2020, 30 feature-length episodes were produced. The series aired at Prime time in the channel ZDF.

Guest
 Mehdi Nebbou as Hamid Sherzad

See also
List of German television series

External links
 

German crime television series
2000s German police procedural television series
2010s German police procedural television series
2002 German television series debuts
2010s German television series
Television shows set in Munich
German-language television shows
ZDF original programming
Grimme-Preis for fiction winners